Agustín Abarca (27 December 1882, Talca – 28 May 1953, Santiago) was a Chilean painter. He was a member of the Generación del 13.
Abarca went to the Liceo de Hombres and the Instituto Comercial in Talca before being introduced to painting by Pablo Burchard. From 1904 to 1907 he studied at the Universidad Católica under Pedro Lira and Alberto Valenzuela Llanos.

References

External links 
Museo Nacional de Bellas Artes - Artistas Plásticos Chilenos- Agustín Abarca
Portal de arte - Agustín Abarco
Museo de Arte Contemporáneo - Agustín Abarca

1882 births
1953 deaths
20th-century Chilean painters
20th-century Chilean male artists
Chilean male painters